Two ships of the Royal Australian Navy (RAN) have been named HMAS Gawler, for the town of Gawler, South Australia.

 , a Bathurst-class corvette launched in 1941 and transferred to the Turkish Navy in 1946
 , a Fremantle-class patrol boat launched in 1983 and decommissioned in 2006

Battle honours
Ships named HMAS Gawler are entitled to carry three battle honours:
 Pacific 1942
 Indian Ocean 1943–45
 Sicily 1943

References

Royal Australian Navy ship names